Where There's Smoke may refer to:

 Where There's Smoke..., a 1979 album by Smokey Robinson
 Where There's Smoke (The Cruel Sea album), 2001 
 Where There's Smoke.. (Gibson/Miller Band album), 1993
 "Where There's Smoke", this album's title track, later recorded by Archer/Park
 "Where There's Smoke" (The Brady Bunch), an episode of The Brady Bunch
 "Where There's Smoke..." (Sex and the City), an episode of Sex and the City
 "Where There's Smoke" (Superman: The Animated Series), an episode of Superman: The Animated Series
 "Where There's Smoke" (That's So Raven), an episode of That's So Raven
 Where There's Smoke, a 1993 novel by Sandra Brown

See also 
 Where There's Smoke There's Cheech & Chong, a 2002 comedy album by Cheech & Chong
 "Where There's Smoke There's Fired", an episode of Frasier
 No Smoke Without Fire, an album by Wishbone Ash